Shigu may refer to:

Stone Drums of Qin, also known as Shigu (Stone Drums), the oldest known stone inscriptions in China
Lost and Love, a 2015 Chinese film, also known as Shigu
Shigu, Ghana, a community in Tamale Metropolitan District, Northern Region, Ghana

Places in China
Shigu District, Hengyang, Hunan
Shigu Railway Station, in Dongguan, Guangdong

Towns
Shigu, Fujian (石鼓), in Yongchun County, Fujian
Shigu, Guangdong (石鼓), in Gaozhou, Guangdong
Shigu, Henan (石固), in Changge, Henan
Shigu, Hubei (石鼓), in Danjiangkou, Hubei
Shigu, Hunan, in Xiangtan County, Hunan
Shigu, Shaanxi (石鼓), in Baoji, Shaanxi
Shigu, Yunnan (石鼓), in Yulong County, Yunnan

Townships
Shigu Township, Yuechi County (石鼓乡), in Anyue County, Sichuan
Shigu Township, Yibin (石鼓乡), in Yibin, Sichuan
Shigu Township, Yuechi County (石鼓乡), in Yuechi County, Sichuan